Brian Christopher Tucker (born December 27, 1975) worked at Charles Schwab Corporation and founded Punta Brava Golf Club, a private golf and surf club with Red McCombs.  Tucker serves on the board of The Century Club of San Diego in support of San Diego community and local youth programs.

Biography
Tucker was born in Pasadena, California, and earned degrees in business and economics from Wheaton College and a master's in dispute resolution from The Strauss Institute for Dispute Resolution in the Pepperdine University School of Law, Tucker served as an executive at Charles Schwab Corporation.

Tucker discovered a parcel of land hidden at the tip of the Punta Banda peninsula, which extends 7 miles into the Pacific Ocean. The land sits in the middle of the Bay of Todos Santos, which on June 21, 2014 was inducted into the World Surfing Reserves  and is one of the 6 events on the World Surf League's Big Wave Tour. 

After putting together the project, now called Punta Brava, Red McCombs partnered with Tucker on the design and entitlement. Golf course architect Tom Doak announced he will lead the project design on The Fried Egg podcast in 2022.

Other work
Brian Tucker is also a co-founder of Iaomai Medical Ministries, a San Diego-based Christian humanitarian organization focused on improving healthcare for children and communities in Central America and the Caribbean. Tucker served on medical missions to Jamaica, Guatemala, and Mexico from 2009-2018. Tucker is fluent in Spanish, and has also been invited to lecture on development and investment issues in Baja California and has been involved with other issues in the Ensenada area. Tucker is on the Board of Young Life, the San Diego Chamber of Commerce as well as the Lincoln Club.

References

External links
 Punta Brava Golf & Surf Club
 Tactical Air Operations
 Skydive San Diego
 Iaomai Medical Ministries charity

American real estate businesspeople
1975 births
Living people
People from Pasadena, California
American expatriates in Mexico